Lisa K. Fair McEvers is a North Dakota lawyer and jurist who serves as a justice of the North Dakota Supreme Court since 2014. She previously served as Commissioner of the North Dakota Department of Labor from 2005 to 2010 and district judge from 2010 to 2014.

Early life and education
McEvers was born in Grafton, North Dakota and raised in Minto, North Dakota. She graduated cum laude from the University of North Dakota in 1993 with a Bachelor of Business Administration in Information Management. She graduated with distinction from the University of North Dakota School of Law in 1997.

Career 
McEvers worked in court administration in the Northeast Judicial District of North Dakota before attending law school. After law school, she clerked at the North Dakota Supreme Court. She was in private legal practice from 1998 to 2001. She served as Cass County Assistant State's Attorney from 2001 to 2005.

She was appointed North Dakota Commissioner of Labor in July 2005. She was appointed district judge for the East Central Judicial District in 2010 and was chambered in Fargo, North Dakota. In 2014, Governor Jack Dalrymple appointed McEvers to the North Dakota Supreme Court to fill a vacancy created by the retirement of Justice Mary Muehlen Maring. She was elected to an unexpired two-year term in 2016 and re-elected to a ten-year term in 2018.

References 

Living people
Year of birth missing (living people)
21st-century American judges
21st-century American politicians
21st-century American women politicians
American women lawyers
North Dakota Labor Commissioners
North Dakota lawyers
Justices of the North Dakota Supreme Court
University of North Dakota alumni
Women in North Dakota politics
21st-century American women judges